Marshallton is an unincorporated community, census designated place, and federal historic district in West Bradford Township, Chester County, Pennsylvania, United States. As of 2020, the CDP has a population of 500. It is one of three historic districts in West Bradford Township that are on the National Register of Historic Places.  The village is largely known for its historic buildings, some notable restaurants, and the nearby Highland Orchards, a pick-your-own orchard offering a variety of produce year round and very popular for its apples and pumpkins as well as products made from the same.  Highland Orchards is a frequent field trip destination for local schools, especially in the fall.

The Marshallton Historic District encompasses 65 contributing buildings and 3 contributing sites. It includes the separately listed Humphry Marshall House, Marshalton Inn, and Bradford Friends Meetinghouse.

It was added to the National Register of Historic Places in 1986.

References

External links
History of West Bradford and Marshallton

Federal architecture in Pennsylvania
Georgian architecture in Pennsylvania
Unincorporated communities in Chester County, Pennsylvania
Buildings and structures in Chester County, Pennsylvania
Historic districts on the National Register of Historic Places in Pennsylvania
Unincorporated communities in Pennsylvania
National Register of Historic Places in Chester County, Pennsylvania